Photoalbum is a solo album by Czech musician Ivan Kral, former member of Patti Smith Group. It was released in 2002 by CDirect label and it was produced by Kral himself together with Vladimír Papež. Kral on the album plays guitar, bass, keyboards and sings; he is accompanied by drummer Emil Frátrik and harmonica player Vladimír Papež. It was his last solo studio album to 2014's Always.

Track listing
 "Pretty Lady"
 "You Take My Money"
 "Funny Farm"
 "Put'em Up!"
 "Telling Lies"
 "Smoke Out"
 "I'm Lazy"
 "Another Broken Heart"
 "Time"
 "You're No Good"
 "Let It Go"
 "Hold Me Now"
 "Addiction"
 "Dark Eyes"

Personnel
 Ivan Kral − vocals, guitars, bass guitar, keyboards
 Emil Frátrik − drums
 Vladimír Papež − harmonica

References 

Ivan Kral albums
Albums produced by Ivan Kral
1991 albums